The Confederation of Trade Unions of Armenia (CTUA), is a national trade union center of Armenia. It is led by Chairman Eduard Tumasyan.

About
The Confederation was established on 1 October 1992 and currently unites 23 trade union branches, which includes over 730 organizations. As of April 2016, there are approximately 208,000 trade union members (17.4% of all employees).

International cooperation
The Confederation is a full member of the General Confederation of Trade Unions and the International Trade Union Confederation. In addition, Chairman Eduard Tumasyan is a member of the Executive Committee of the Pan-European Regional Council.

Armenia is a member of the International Labour Organization and has ratified 23 conventions of the ILO. Armenia has also committed itself to adhering to international standards such as Article 11 of the European Convention on Human Rights, which includes the right to form trade unions and guarantees their basic rights.

See also

 List of trade unions
 Trade unions in Armenia
 Trade unions in Europe

References

External links
 Confederation of Trade Unions of Armenia on Facebook

Trade unions in Armenia
Trade unions in Europe
General Confederation of Trade Unions
National federations of trade unions